Stakis Hotels was a hotel company in the United Kingdom led by Sir Reo Stakis, headquartered in Glasgow.

History
The company was founded by Reo Stakis in the 1930s. It was sold to Hilton Group in 2000 for £1.2 billion. Following the sale, many of the Stakis top personnel were retained by Hilton and took some of the senior positions within the company including Sir David Michels the then CEO of Stakis, who went on to become Chief Executive of Hilton Group.

Gallery

References

Defunct hotel chains
Scottish brands
Hotel chains in the United Kingdom